The municipal elections for Leeds were held on Thursday 13 May 1965, with one third of the council and an extra vacancy in Allerton to be elected.

Building upon the previous year, the Conservatives fully reversed the downward trend they'd been on since 1960. With a whopping 10.2% swing their way, they defeated the Labour Party in a manner not seen since 1951, with Labour's share reduced to the thirties - surpassing even their record low then.

The Conservatives six gains were largely a regaining of Labour's 1963 gains, with the notable exceptions of Beeston, which they already held, and Kirkstall - a first for the ward, which had been monolithically Labour since the boundary changes in 1951.

The Conservatives also recovered Roundhay from Labour who gained it in a by-election in 1963.

Elsewhere, the Liberals continued their decline from the 1962 highs, now at near enough where they were pre-spike. In contrast, the Communists, having steadily raised their candidates in each election since the mid-1950s were now fielding a record of 12, achieving party records in both vote and share. Turnout fell again by just over two percent on last year's figure to 34.5%.

Election result

The result had the following consequences for the total number of seats on the council after the elections:

Ward result

References

1965 English local elections
1965
1960s in Leeds